The 2008 NCAA Division I baseball tournament was held from May 30 through June 25, 2008 and was part of the 2008 NCAA Division I baseball season. The 64 NCAA Division I college baseball teams were selected out of an eligible 286 teams on May 26, 2008.  Thirty teams were awarded an automatic bid as champions of their conference, and 34 teams were selected at-large by the NCAA Division I Baseball Committee.  Thirty-eight of the 64 selected teams participated in the 2007 tournament.

The 2008 tournament culminated with 8 teams advancing to the College World Series at historic Rosenblatt Stadium in Omaha, Nebraska, on June 14.

The Fresno State Bulldogs beat the Georgia Bulldogs in the best-of-three championship series to win the NCAA Men's Division I Baseball Championship. Fresno State became the lowest seeded team (4th in the Regionals) to win the National Championship in NCAA history, and the fifth consecutive baseball team to win the title that was not one of the eight national seeds. They were considered a "Cinderella" team throughout the tournament.  This was only the third national championship of any kind in school history, following the 1968 NCAA Men's Tennis Tournament and the 1998 NCAA Division I softball national champions.

Fresno State sophomore third baseman Tommy Mendonca won the Most Outstanding Player Award. Tommy hit four home runs and had 11 RBIs and also made a number of spectacular plays in the field.

The first day of the 2008 CWS was moved to Saturday (June 14) from the traditional Friday.  Also, if all games were needed in the first double-elimination round, it would take eight days to complete rather than seven. The NCAA cited the need to be more flexible in the super-regional round in case of inclement weather.  It also allowed for greater potential ticket revenue, in part because the extra "if-necessary" day would now be ticketed separately if both games are played.

Bids

Automatic bids
Conference champions from 30 Division I conferences earned automatic bids to regionals.  The remaining 34 spots were awarded to schools as at-large invitees.

Bids by conference

National seeds
Bold indicates CWS participant.
Miami (FL) (47–8)
North Carolina (46–12)
 (45–11)
Florida State (48–10)
 (37–19)
 (42–13)
LSU (43-16-1)
Georgia (35-21-1)

Regionals and super regionals

Regional schedule
Regional rounds were held Friday, May 30 through Monday, June 2. Each regional followed a similar format, with 2 games played on Friday, Saturday, and Sunday, and one on Monday if needed.

Best-of-three super regionals were held Friday, June 6 through Monday, June 9. Four series were played Friday-Sunday and four series were played Saturday-Monday.

Brackets
Bold indicates winner. * indicates extra innings.

Coral Gables Super Regional
Hosted by Miami (FL) at Mark Light Field

Athens Super Regional
Hosted by Georgia at Foley Field

Fullerton Super Regional
Hosted by Cal State Fullerton at Goodwin Field

Tallahassee Super Regional
Hosted by Florida State at Dick Howser Stadium

Cary Super Regional
Hosted by North Carolina at USA Baseball National Training Complex

Baton Rouge Super Regional
Hosted by LSU at Alex Box Stadium

Houston Super Regional
Hosted by Rice at Reckling Park

Tempe Super Regional
Hosted by Arizona State at Packard Stadium

College World Series

Participants

Bracket

Championship series

Monday, June 23

Game 14, 6:00 PM

Tuesday, June 24

Game 15, 6:35 PM

Wednesday, June 25

Game 16, 6:00 PM

All-Tournament Team

The following players were members of the College World Series All-Tournament Team.

Record by conference

The columns RF, SR, WS, NS, CS, and NC respectively stand for the regional finals, super regionals, College World Series teams, national semifinals, championship series, and national champion.

Tournament notes
Oregon State was not invited to the NCAA tournament, marking the first time since 1991 that the defending champion did not return to the following year's tourney (Georgia).
Clemson was not invited to the NCAA tournament, breaking a streak of consecutive appearances for the Tigers that dated back to the 1987 season.
Dallas Baptist made its first appearance.  DBU was the first independent institution to qualify for the Division I tourney (other than Miami (Fla.), which kept an independent schedule during its years in the Big East) since Cal State Northridge did so in 1992.
Michigan was the only non-#1-seed selected to host a regional, forcing #1 seed Arizona to play an away regional, as the NCAA organizing committee said it was trying to maintain geographical balance with the host sites.

Round 1
Four No. 1 seeded regional host schools, out of 16 total, lost first-round games to No. 4 seeds:
Georgia 7, Lipscomb 10
Stanford 2, UC Davis 4
Florida St. 0, Bucknell 7
Long Beach St. 3, Fresno State 7
Five No. 3 seeds upset No. 2 seeds in the opening round.

Round 2
Fresno State was the only #4 seed to register wins in the first two rounds of the tournament.
Tulane was the only #3 seed to register wins in the first two rounds of the tournament.
9 of the 16 #1 seeds registered wins in the first two rounds of the tournament.

Super regionals
Six of the eight national seeds advanced to the College World Series.  Only #3 seed Arizona State and #5 seed Cal State Fullerton were unable to make it past super regionals.
Fresno State became the first team in the history of the NCAA tournament to make it to the College World Series as a #4 regional seed.

CWS records tied or broken
 Most runs scored in an inning: 11 (tied)(Stanford, 9th inning, Game 1 against Florida State)
Most runners left on base in a nine-inning game: 17 (tied) (Florida State, Game 5 against Miami)
 Most doubles hit by a player: 3 (tied) by Rich Poythress Georgia against Stanford, Game 11.
 Most losses by a team who won the College World Series: 31 (Fresno State)
 Lowest seed to win the College World Series: #4 regional seed, #89 RPI (Fresno State)

Television/radio/online coverage

Regionals
During the regionals, ESPNU showed games from Coral Gables (Karl Ravech and Barry Larkin) and Fullerton (Kyle Peterson), with Mike Gleason and Will Kimmey in the Charlotte ESPNU studios.
CBS College Sports Network was not originally scheduled to show any games, as in years past.  However, it aired Nebraska's Friday and Saturday games through a simulcast with Nebraska Educational Telecommunications.
The Baton Rouge regional was shown regionally on Cox Sports Television, the Athens regional on Comcast Sports Southeast/Charter Sports Southeast, and the final two days of the Tallahassee regional aired on Sun Sports.

Super regionals
All super-regional games were shown on ESPN, ESPN2 or ESPNU on television and ESPN360 through online streaming video.  Announcers included Karl Ravech, Pam Ward, Dave Ryan, Brian Jordan, Robin Ventura, and Kyle Peterson.

Mike Gleason and Will Kimmey made up the studio team (in Bristol, Connecticut) for both regional and super-regional rounds.

College World Series
 All College World Series games were shown on ESPN, ESPN2, ESPNU, or ESPN Classic on television and ESPN360 through online streaming video.
 Westwood One broadcast all CWS championship series games on radio.  Participating institutions were allowed local broadcast rights in the earlier rounds, and games were also available on XM Satellite Radio and Sirius Satellite Radio.

References

External links
Schedule, results, and game times at ESPN

NCAA Division I Baseball Championship
 
Baseball in Houston